Simha Swapna is a 1968 Indian Kannada-language swashbuckler film directed by W. R. Subba Rao and produced by S. Bhavanarayan. The film stars Rajkumar, Udaykumar, Narasimharaju and Dikki Madhavarao. The film has musical score by G. K. Venkatesh.

Cast

Rajkumar
Udaykumar
Narasimharaju
Dikki Madhavarao
Dinesh
Raghavendra Rao
Hanumanthachar
Rathnakar
Jayanthi
B. V. Radha
Sadhana
Ramadevi
Jyothilakshmi

Soundtrack
The music was composed by Dakshinamoorthy.

References

External links
 
 

1968 films
1960s Kannada-language films
Films scored by G. K. Venkatesh